South Harper Historic District is a national historic district located at Laurens, Laurens County, South Carolina. It encompasses 44 contributing buildings in a residential section of Laurens. It includes a collection of early-20th century vernacular residences and houses that range in date from the early-19th century to about 1935, with almost half having been built during the first decade of the 20th century.  Architectural styles include Neo-Classical, Queen Anne, Colonial Revival, and Bungalow.  Notable dwellings include the Hix-Blackwell House (c. 1857), H. Douglas Gray House (c. 1910), Machen-Long House (c. 1905), and Gov. Robert Archer Cooper House (c. 1905).

The South Harper Historic District was added to the National Register of Historic Places in 1986.

References 

Houses on the National Register of Historic Places in South Carolina
Historic districts on the National Register of Historic Places in South Carolina
Queen Anne architecture in South Carolina
Colonial Revival architecture in South Carolina
Neoclassical architecture in South Carolina
Houses in Laurens County, South Carolina
National Register of Historic Places in Laurens County, South Carolina
1986 establishments in South Carolina